Optum, Inc. is an American healthcare services provider with business interests encompassing technology and related services, pharmacy care services (including a pharmacy benefit manager) and various direct healthcare services. It has been a subsidiary of UnitedHealth Group since 2011. UHG formed Optum by merging its existing pharmacy and care delivery services into the single Optum brand, comprising three main businesses: OptumHealth, OptumInsight and OptumRx. In 2017, Optum accounted for 44 percent of UnitedHealth Group's profits and as of 2019, Optum's revenues have surpassed $100 billion. Also in early 2019, Optum gained significant media attention regarding a trade secrets lawsuit that the company filed against former executive David William Smith, after Smith left Optum to join Haven, the joint healthcare venture of Amazon, JPMorgan Chase, and Berkshire Hathaway.

On January 15, 2019, Optum said that the revenue of the company had surpassed $100 billion for the first time, growing by 11.1% year over year to $101.3 billion. This also means that Optum will contribute more than 50% of UnitedHealth's 2020 earnings, making Optum UnitedHealth's fastest-growing unit.

History

Organization 
Optum's three businesses, OptumRx, OptumHealth and OptumInsight focuses on five core capabilities: data and analytics, pharmacy care services, population health, healthcare delivery and healthcare operations. Optum serves employers, government agencies, health plans, life science companies, care providers and individuals and families offering products in data and analytics, pharmacy care services, health care operations and delivery, population health management and advisory services.

Major acquisitions 
Since Optum's founding in 2011, the company has acquired various healthcare technology services to build out its pharmacy benefit manager and care services offerings.
 April 2011: UnitedHealth Group announces Optum master brand, bringing together pharmacy services, data & analytics tools, and care delivery services under one roof.
 Jan. 2013: Partnering with Mayo Clinic, Optum unveils OptumLabs, a health data initiative.
 Oct. 2013: Optum, partnering with Dignity Health, launches Optum360, a revenue cycle management venture.
 Feb. 2014: Optum purchases a majority stake in Audax Health Solutions, a patient engagement company. Audax is later rebranded as Rally Health.
 April 2015: Optum acquires MedExpress, an urgent care and preventative services company.
 July 2015: Catamaran, a pharmacy benefit manager, joins OptumRx.
 Jan. 2017: Optum acquires Surgical Care Affiliates, an ambulatory surgery center and surgical hospital provider.
 Aug. 2017: Optum announces it will acquire Advisory Board Company's healthcare business.
 Dec. 2017: Optum announces acquisition of DaVita Medical Group from DaVita Inc.
 Sept. 2019: UnitedHealth Group announces acquisition of Equian, LLC for $3.2 billion. A Payment Integrity Institution that has joined the Optum family.
 Jan 2021: UnitedHealth Group announces acquisition of Change Healthcare LLC, evaluated to worth $8 billion, in addition to paying off its $5 billion debt for a total of $13 billion. It is said to be merged with OptumInsight.
 Aug 2021: UnitedHealth Group announces acquisition of Solutran LLC. 
 May 2022: Optum acquires Atrius Health, an independent physician-led healthcare organization.
 June 2022 Bordeaux UK Holdings II Limited, an affiliate of Optum business acquires EMIS Health for a 49% premium on its closing share price.
 July 2022 Optum acquires Caremount Medical, Inc., of southeastern New York State, Riverside Medical Care of New Jersey, and ProHealth Medical Group of Western Connecticut, three midsized physician-led independent medical groups. In its announcement to the public and patients of the acquisitions, insurance company UnitedHealth Group is not mentioned, casting the transaction as a merger of three midsize physician-led companies into a new company rather than three acquisitions by an existing much larger Fortune 500 corporation with multiple types of health-related acquisitions, as described above.   

This Optum-UnitedHealth model of vertical integration is pointed to as having sparked a pattern of acquisition activity in the healthcare industry; most notably, mega-mergers between CVS-Aetna, Cigna-Express Scripts and Humana-Kindred. "Optum's been the leader in showing how a managed care organization with an ambulatory care delivery platform and a pharmacy benefit manager all in house can lower or maintain and bend cost trend and then drive better market share gains in their health insurance business. I think they have been the impetus in the large space for the Aetna-CVS deal," Ana Gupte, managing director of healthcare services at Leerink, said in an interview with Healthcare Dive.

Leadership 
 Jul. 2011: Larry Renfro named as Optum CEO
 Mar. 2018: Optum announces Larry Renfro to step down as Optum CEO
 Jul. 2018: Sir Andrew Witty starts as CEO of Optum
 Feb 2021: Sir Andrew Witty appointed as CEO of UnitedHealth Group (Optum's parent company). No successor to the Optum CEO role is named.

Controversies

Haven lawsuit 
In early 2019, UnitedHealth Group filed a lawsuit asking a U.S. District Judge Mark Wolf to stop former Optum executive, David William Smith, from working at Haven (the Amazon, JP Morgan and Berkshire-Hathaway joint-healthcare venture). Optum argued that Haven is in direct competition with its business and as such, Smith's employment would be in violation of a noncompete agreement that he signed while with Optum. Smith, meanwhile, asked the judge to send the parties into closed-door arbitration. Wolf rejected Optum's request and allowed Smith's, putting court proceedings on hold until the arbitration process is complete.

The case garnered media attention as setting a precedent in trade secret litigation ahead of an anticipated wave of vertical integration in the healthcare industry and for uncovering previously unknown details about Haven. The case has also been referred to as having shed light on the threat that pharmacy benefit managers feel to bottom lines amid mounting bipartisan pressure to control rising healthcare costs. Testimony brought by Haven chief operating officer Jack Stoddard was unsealed after a motion brought by the parent companies of Stat News and The Wall Street Journal.

Alleged racial bias 
A 2019 study published in Science, alleges the "algorithm used to manage the healthcare of millions of Americans shows dramatic biases against black patients". Said algorithm, applied to over 200 million individuals yearly, "significantly underestimates the amount of care black patients need compared with white patients". In fact, "less money is spent on black patients with the same level of need as white patients, causing the algorithm to conclude that black patients were less sick". Optum claims "its system helps 'clinicians provide more effective patient care every day'".

See also 
Haven (healthcare)

References

External links 
 

2011 establishments in Minnesota
American companies established in 2011
Corporate spin-offs
Health care companies based in Minnesota
Health care companies established in 2011
Multinational health care companies
Pharmacy benefit management companies based in the United States